Choazil Passage is a passage in the Mozambique Channel which separates the mainland of Mtsamboro in northwest Mayotte from the Choazil Islands. It is said to be 5 1/2 fathoms deep mid channel.

References

Bodies of water of Mayotte